Mohadevpur Sarba Mongala (pilot) High School is a high school in Mohadevpur, Naogaon, Bangladesh. It was established in 1921. It's co-education type is combined.

History 
This school was established in 1921 taking the name of the local zamindar Nayanchandra Rai Chowdhury's mother Sarba Mongala Debi in Mohadevpur. Freedom fighter Tinkari Chakraborty was instrumental in establishing the school. Many of the famous individuals of the country have studied here. The school's head master Babu Nil Ratan Das was known as a poet and litterateur. Many of his writings were published.

References

External links 
 Mohadevpur Sarba Mongala (pilot) High School at Sohopathi

Schools in Naogaon District